The Châtel de Sassy is a ruined castle in the commune of Sassy in the Calvados département of France.

The castle dates from the 11th century. A charter from 1175 records the owner as Robert de Sassy. A study in 1887 described the remains as a large rectangular enceinte with a turret in each corner. A second enceinte was defended by a moat cut into the rock.

The castle is private property.

See also
List of castles in France

References

External links
 

Castles in Calvados (department)
Ruined castles in France